The 1932 South Dakota Coyotes football team was an American football team that represented the University of South Dakota in the North Central Conference (NCC) during the 1932 college football season. In its second season under head coach Stanley G. Backman, the team compiled a 4–5–1 record (1–1–1 against NCC opponents), finished in third place out of five teams in the NCC, and outscored opponents by a total of 78 to 70. The team played its home games at Inman Field in Vermillion, South Dakota.

Schedule

References

South Dakota
South Dakota Coyotes football seasons
South Dakota Coyotes football